Sergey Strelkov (born 4 January 1991) is a former Russian tennis player.

Strelkov has a career high ATP singles ranking of 892 achieved on 16 September 2013. He also has a career high ATP doubles ranking of 669 achieved on 30 August 2010.

Strelkov made his ATP main draw debut at the 2013 St. Petersburg Open in the doubles draw partnering Dmitri Marfinsky after the pair received entry into the main draw as alternates.

References

External links

1991 births
Living people
Russian male tennis players